D'Urso is an Italian surname, a patronymic from the name  Urso.  Notable people with the surname include:
Andy D'Urso
Anthony D'Urso
Barbara d'Urso
Christian D'Urso
Giuseppe D'Urso
Macarena D'Urso

See also

References

Italian-language surnames
Patronymic surnames